Brow is used in the name of several geographical features:

Brow, Dumfries and Galloway, hamlet about 3 km from Ruthwell on the Solway Firth in Dumfries and Galloway, Scotland
Brow Head (Irish: Ceann Bró) is the most southerly point of mainland Ireland
Brow Point, the western entrance headland of Blue Whale Harbour on the north coast of South Georgia
Brow Monument and Brow Monument Trail, Kaibab National Forest, in the National Register of Historic Places for Coconino County, Arizona
Berry Brow, semi-rural village in West Yorkshire, England, situated about 3 km south of Huddersfield
Cinnamon Brow, area on the east side of Warrington, England, between Orford and Birchwood
Faulds Brow, small rise in the English Lake District, northwest of the village of Caldbeck in Cumbria
Hill Brow, small village in the Chichester District of West Sussex, England
Mere Brow, small village in Lancashire, England, situated between Tarleton and Banks
Shaw's Brow, the original name of William Brown Street in Liverpool, England, a road remarkable for the number of public buildings
Sunny Brow or Sunnybrow, village in County Durham, in England
Swing Brow or Swingbrow, hamlet near to Chatteris, Cambridgeshire lying alongside the Forty Foot Drain built by Vermuyden

See also
Brow (disambiguation)

Geography-related lists